Idiocelyphus is a genus of beetle flies. It is known from the Indomalayan realm. Most are from the Philippines.

Description
Idiocelyphus may be distinguished from the other genera in the family by the presence of numerous bristles on the mesonotum and two pairs of scutellar bristles, the shorter scutellum is not any longer than the thorax.

Species
I. bakeri Malloch, 1929
I. bifasciatus Tenorio, 1969
I. bilobus Tenorio, 1969
I. forcipatus Tenorio, 1969
I. parviceps Tenorio, 1969
I. raniformis Tenorio, 1969
I. spatulus Tenorio, 1969
I. steyskali Tenorio, 1969

References

Celyphidae
Diptera of Asia
Lauxanioidea genera